Aloo may refer to:

Food 
Aloo, a South Asian term for potatoes, found in the names of a number of dishes:
 Aloo gobi, potatoes and cauliflower
 Aloo gosht, potatoes and meat in shorba
 Aloo mutter,  potatoes and peas in tomato gravy
 Aloo paratha, an unleavened bread stuffed with mashed potatoes
 Aloo pie, a fried pastry filled with potatoes and vegetables
 Aloo tikki, deep fried potato patties with peas and spices
 Dum aloo, fried potatoes with gravy
 Saag aloo, fried potatoes with spinach (palak) or fenugreek (methi) curry

People
 Aloo Jal Chibber (fl. 1970s), Indian politician from Maharashtra
 Paul Alo'o (born 1983), Cameroonian professional footballer

Other uses 
 Chuck Aloo, a character in Late Night with Conan O'Brien parody segment "60", played by Andy Blitz
 Rex Aloo, a title referring to Coroticus, one of the kings of Strathclyde

See also 
 Alu (disambiguation)
 Alo (disambiguation)
 Alou (disambiguation)